Gary Fox may refer to:

 Gary Fox (politician) (1943–2022), politician in Ontario, Canada
 Gary Fox (badminton) (born 1990), badminton player from England